Northfleet Technology College Basketball Academy was started in 2009 by Northfleet Technology College to recruit elite basketball players from the South East of England. The academy is based at Northfleet Technology College, Colyer Road, Northfleet, Kent, DA11 8BG, England. The team is an official Kent Crusaders Basketball Academy who play in U19 Academies Basketball League and the U17 & U19 England Basketball Schools competition.

Kit
Northfleet Technology College Basketball Academy athletes are equipped with Nike tracksuits, bags, training tees and Medway Park Crusaders kits and shooting shirts each with their own number and name.

Home court
Northfleet Technology College Basketball Academy play in the state-of-the-art basketball gym at Northfleet Technology College which was opened in 2010, facilitating plexi backboards, flexi rims and a spring-loaded floor.

Players

Coaches
Head Coach & Director of Basketball: Martin Parry

Associate Head Coach: Rob Newson

Assistant Coach: Sam Lane

2014-15 Fixtures

Team Honours

External links

Basketball teams in England